Sekadar Di Pinggiran is the third studio album from Malaysian singer Francissca Peter released in 1986.

Awards and recognitions
 The album released by Warner Music Malaysia achieves double Platinum status.
 Malaysian readers voted "Sekadar Di Pinggiran" as 'Song of the Year' and another, "Ku Ke Udara Lagi", as "Third Best Song of the Year' in a poll organised by 'The New Straits Times' daily. Her album "Sekadar Di Pinggiran" is voted 'Album of the Year' while Fran wins the award for 'Best Female Artiste of the Year'. 
 Sekadar Di Pinggiran won Champion of Songs Award at the Anugerah Juara Lagu,  a popular annual music competition in Malaysia, organized by TV3 in 1986. 
 The song also was awarded International Award for "Best Song" at the 'Asean Song Festival' in 1987

Track listing

References

External links 
 Official Website
 Official Youtube

1986 albums
Francissca Peter albums
Warner Music Group albums
Malay-language albums